Daviesia preissii is a species of flowering plant in the family Fabaceae and is endemic to the south-west of Western Australia. It is a glabrous shrub with scattered, vertically flattened, tapering, narrowly egg-shaped to elliptic, sharply-pointed phyllodes and yellow and red flowers.

Description

Taxonomy and naming
Daviesia preissii was first formally described in 1844 by Carl Meissner in Lehmann's Plantae Preissianae from specimens collected in 1841.  The specific epithet (preissii) honours Ludwig Preiss, who collected the type specimens.

Distribution and habitat
This daviesia grows in open forest or in kwongan heath on the Darling Range and in the far south-west of Western Australia as far east as Albany and the Stirling Range.

Conservation status
Daviesia preissii is listed as "not threatened" by the Western Australian Government Department of Biodiversity, Conservation and Attractions.

References

preissii
Eudicots of Western Australia
Plants described in 1844
Taxa named by Carl Meissner